The Plymouth Building is a 12-story building in Minneapolis. Built in 1910–1911, it was touted as the world's largest all reinforced concrete office building at the time it was constructed.

In 1936 the building's exterior was renovated, removing much of the ornamentation and beaux arts styling in favor of a cleaner and more modern appearance. This style of architecture (somewhat typical of government buildings in the 1930s) is sometimes called "starved classicism."

In 2014 the building was added to the National Register of Historic Places on the basis of its unique construction methods. Later that year plans were released to convert the building from office space to a boutique hotel.

On August 25, 2016, the Plymouth Building re-opened as the Embassy Suites by Hilton Minneapolis Downtown. It has 290 guest suites, 9,000 square feet of meeting space, as well as a connection to the Lyon's Pub next door.

References

Commercial buildings on the National Register of Historic Places in Minnesota
National Register of Historic Places in Minneapolis
Skyscraper hotels in Minneapolis
Buildings and structures completed in 1911
1911 establishments in Minnesota